Airton Daré (born 9 February 1978 in Bauru, Brazil) is a Brazilian race car driver who has competed in the Indy Racing League. Daré began his racing career in jet ski racing in 1990. He won six Brazilian championships, one South American championship and came fourth in the world championship.  In 1995, he switched to motorsports, participating in Brazilian Formula Fiat.  In 1997, he competed in the Indy Lights and during three years in this category, he managed one victory in Detroit in 1998 and one in Nazareth in 1999, and his best championship result was a sixth place in 1998.  He made his first IRL start in 2000 and was a long-time driver for A. J. Foyt Enterprises. Airton has a single IRL race win which he captured for Foyt in 2002 at Kansas Speedway. He was also the 2000 IRL Rookie of the Year. Dare has five starts in the Indianapolis 500 with a best finish of 8th in 2001. His best IRL points finish is 9th in 2002. He drove in the 2006 Indianapolis 500 for Sam Schmidt Motorsports, finishing in 18th position. He also races stock cars and motocross in his native Brazil.

Racing record

American open-wheel racing results
(key)

IndyCar Series

Indianapolis 500 results

References

The Greatest 33 Profile

1978 births
Living people
People from Bauru
Brazilian racing drivers
IndyCar Series drivers
Brazilian IndyCar Series drivers
Indianapolis 500 drivers
Indy Lights drivers
Stock Car Brasil drivers
Sportspeople from São Paulo (state)

Arrow McLaren SP drivers
A. J. Foyt Enterprises drivers